Andy Riley (born 1970) is a British author, cartoonist, and Emmy-winning screenwriter for TV and film.

Riley has written and drawn many best-selling cartoon books, including The Book of Bunny Suicides (2003) and its sequels, and Great Lies To Tell Small Kids (2005). From 2002 until February 2010 he drew a weekly comic strip called Roasted in The Observer Magazine, a collection of which was released in book form in 2007. Riley also publishes the King Flashypants series of children's books.

With Kevin Cecil, his friend since they attended Aylesbury Grammar School, he created and wrote the sitcoms Year of the Rabbit for Channel 4 and IFC, The Great Outdoors for BBC Four, Hyperdrive for BBC Two and Slacker Cats for the ABC Family Channel. Their other television work includes Veep (for which they each won an Emmy in 2015 in the Outstanding Comedy Series category), Black Books, the Comic Relief one-off special Robbie the Reindeer, for which he and Cecil won a BAFTA in 2000, Little Britain, Tracey Ullman's Show, Trigger Happy TV, So Graham Norton, Smack the Pony, The Armando Iannucci Shows, Harry and Paul, Big Bad World, Come Fly With Me, and Spitting Image. The Radio Four panel game they wrote with Jon Holmes and Tony Roche,  The 99p Challenge, ran for five series from 2000.

They wrote for the Miramax animated feature Gnomeo and Juliet, and its sequel Sherlock Gnomes.

Riley has co-written two TV adaptations of David Walliams books: Gangsta Granny and The Boy in the Dress.

Riley was educated at Aylesbury Grammar School and Pembroke College, Oxford, where he read Modern History. He is namechecked in the Father Ted Christmas Special as 'Father Andy Riley'.

Screenwriting credits

Awards and nominations

Bibliography 
Standalone Cartoon Books

 Roasted (2007)
 D.I.Y. Dentistry and Other Alarming Inventions (2008)
 Selfish Pigs (2009)
 Wine Makes Mummy Clever (2011)
 Beer Makes Daddy Strong (2011)
 Puppy Versus Kitten (2017)

Bunny Suicides

 The Book of Bunny Suicides (2003)
 Return of the Bunny Suicides (2005)
 Dawn of the Bunny Suicides (2010)

Lies to Tell Small Kids

 Great Lies to Tell Small Kids (2006)
 Loads More Lies to Tell Small Kids (2007)

King Flashypants

 King Flashypants and the Evil Emperor (2017)
 King Flashypants and the Creature from Crong (2018)
 King Flashypants and the Toys of Terror (2018)

References

External links
Andy Riley's official website

Alumni of Pembroke College, Oxford
1970 births
Living people
English comics writers
English comics artists
English cartoonists
English screenwriters
English male screenwriters
English television writers
People educated at Aylesbury Grammar School
British male television writers